Nur with other writing Nour or Noor, (formerly, Suldeh) is a city and capital of Nur County, located on the Caspian Sea in Mazandaran Province of northern Iran.

At the 2006 census, its population was 21,806, in 6,164 families.

Overview
Nur is one of the oldest cities of Mazandaran Province. 
Located on the Caspian Sea coast. It derives its name from Nur County, of which it is the administrative seat. In the past, Nur was reputedly known as Suldeh and is one of the ancient cities of Mazandaran.
Nur Forest Park, the largest forest park in the Middle East with an area about 4000 hectares and a variety of plant species, is located in this region.

Personalities

Mirza Aqa Khan Nuri (1807 – 1865) otherwise known as Aqa Khan Nuri, E'temad-ol Dowleh was a politician in Qajar Iran, who served as prime minister (ṣadr-e aʿẓam) between 1851-58 during the reign of king Naser al-Din Shah Qajar.
Nima Yooshij (1897 – 1960), also called Nimā born Ali Esfandiāri, was a contemporary Persian and Tabarian poet who started the she'r-e now ("new poetry") also known as she'r-e nimaa'i ("Nimaic poetry") trend in Iran. He is considered as the father of modern Persian poetry.
Sheikh Fazlollah Noori (1843 – 1909), was a prominent Shia Muslim cleric in Qajar Iran during the late 19th and early 20th century and founder of political Islam in Iran.
Bahá'u'lláh (1817 – 1892), was a Persian religious leader, and the founder of the Bahá'í Faith, which advocates universal peace and unity among all races, nations, and religions.
Gholam-Hossein Banan (1911 – 1986) was an Iranian musician and singer. One of the most prominent Iranian singers of the 20th century, he was renowned for the quality of his voice.
Haji Washington (1849–1937) was an Iranian politician, cabinet minister, and diplomat and belonged to one of the oldest aristocratic families in Persia - the Khadjenouris, tracing their history back to over one thousand years.
Subh-i-Azal (1831 – 1912), was a Persian religious leader of Azali Bábism[ also known as the Bayání Faith.
Mirza Husain Noori Tabarsi (1838 - 1902), popularly known as Muhaddis Noori / Al-Mohaddith Al-Noori, was a top Shi'a Islamic cleric and father of Islamic Shi'a Renaissance.
Noureddin Kianouri (1915-1999), politician and revolutionary.
Parviz Natel-Khanlari (1914–1990) was an Iranian literary scholar, linguist, author, researcher and professor at Tehran University.
Hossein Shah-Hosseini was an Iranian politician who served as the head of the Physical Education Organization, as well as the National Olympic Committee during the interim cabinet of Mehdi Bazargan.
Ali Akbar Nategh-Nouri s an Iranian politician.
Mirza Hassan Khan Esfandiary (1867 – 1945) was an Iranian politician and 12th chairman of the Iranian parliament.
Gholam Hossein Sadighi was an Iranian politician and Minister of Interior in the government of Prime Minister Mohammad Mossadegh in 1953.
Abolhassan Sadighi was an Iranian sculptor and painter and was known as Master Sadighi. He was a student of Ghaffari.
Manouchehr Sotoudeh  was an Iranian geographer and scholar of Persian literature. He wrote 60 books and nearly 300 articles.
Musa Nuri Esfandiari was an Iranian diplomat and served as foreign minister and as ambassador during the Pahlavi era.
Pirouz Mojtahedzadeh is an Iranian political scientist and historian. He is a prominent Iranologist, geopolitics researcher, historian and political scientist. He teaches geopolitics at the Tarbiat Modares University of Tehran. He has been the advisor of the United Nations University.
Rahman Rezaei is an Iranian retired football player and coach. He is also a former member of the Iran national football team and usually played in the Centre-back position.
Hamed Kavianpour is a retired Iranian professional football player.
Roya Nonahali is an Iranian actress. She studied painting, and has worked in theatre since 1984.
Hanif Omranzadeh is an Iranian former footballer who played as a defender and current coach of Esteghlal F.C. Academy youth team.
Mirza Abdul Vahab Khan Nizam al-mulk From the courtiers of the Qajar period.
Mirza Mohammad Khan Nuri Secretary of State for Foreign Affairs of Iran during the Qajar period.
Hassan Nayerzadeh is an Iranian teacher.
Ahmad Nategh-Nouri is a politician.
Mirza Muhammad Taqi Noori Tabarsi Shiite scholars in the thirteenth century.
Abdollah Behzadi (1918 – 1976), politician, poet, writer and physician.
Ahmad Esfandiari (1922 – 2013), Artist and painter.
Hosein Gil is an Iranian actor.
Parvaneh Kazemi an Iranian climber.

References

External links

 "Nur, Iran", Falling Rain Genomics, Inc.

Cities in Mazandaran Province
Populated places in Nur County
Populated coastal places in Iran
Populated places on the Caspian Sea